Till We Meet Again (lit: Old Moon; formerly known as Sushi Restaurant Legend) is a 2021 Taiwanese romantic fantasy  comedy film, based on the novel of the same name by Giddens Ko. Directed and written by Giddens Ko, and starring Kai Ko, Gingle Wang, Vivian Sung and Umin Boya, it had its premiere at 25th Bucheon International Fantastic Film Festival as opening film on 8 July 2021, and was released theatrically on November 24, 2021 in Taiwan. It is also available for streaming on Disney+ in selected regions on April 2, 2022.

Plot
Ah Lun, who was killed by lightning, came to the underworld with blank memories. He must make a choice: reincarnate as a snail or take up a priesthood, accumulate virtuous virtues, and be reincarnated as a human being. Ah Lun decided to become Yue Lao. He teamed up with Pinky, who had an explosive personality, and came to the world to perform a mission. When Ah Lun met the dog Alu and his owner Xiaomi, his memories of his previous life came back, because Xiaomi was the love of his life. Ah Lun hopes to help Xiaomi in the world find a new marriage, but every red thread tied to Xiaomi's hands has been burnt. It turns out that some things will not change in ten thousand years.

At the same time, Gui Toucheng, who went from the underworld to the human world, launched a bloody revenge operation and found the thief brother who betrayed and killed him five hundred years ago. While Ah Lun was still excited about Xiao Mi's failure to tie the red line, Guitoucheng regarded Xiao Mi as the next target for revenge

Cast
 Kai Ko as Ah Lun
 Gingle Wang as Huang Wenzi/ Pinky
 Vivian Sung as Hong Jing Qing/Xiao Mi
 Umin Boya as Guitoucheng
 Hong Sheng De as Horse Face
 Joelle Lu as Bull Head
 Hou Yan Xi as Member of Yue Lao Group
 Chen Yu as Member of Yue Lao Group
 Chang Tsai Hsing as Member of Yue Lao Group
 Chen Zhao Fei as Member of Yue Lao Group
 Emerson Tsai as Aaron's elementary school classmate
 June Tsai as Grim reaper
 Chiago Liu as Video anchor
 Bruce Hung as Pinky's ex-boyfriend
 Eugenie Liu as Little horse thief
 Kent Tsai as Locomotive owner
 Deng Yu Kai as Locomotive owner's friend
 Marcus Chang as Xiao Mi's classmate
 Alberto Parron as foreigner

Release
Till We Meet Again premiered on July 8, 2021, as the opening film of the 25th Bucheon International Fantastic Film Festival in South Korea. It was also selected for the opening film of the Taipei Film Festival and screened on September 23, 2021, and the Austin Fantasy Film Festival in Texas. Clover Films of Singapore partnered with Taiwan’s Machi Xcelsior Studios and handled the worldwide theatrical releases (except Taiwan and South Korea) for the film. Whereas Hive Filmworks handled the theatrical rights in Korea.

Reception
James Marsh of South China Morning Post gave 4 stars out of 5, and wrote, "With a film that is by turns funny, scary, tragic and achingly romantic, Ko [writer and director] proves once again his unique understanding of the younger generation; having articulated their passions and anxieties on the page, he has now vividly realising them on the big screen."  Marsh further stated, "the film is slick, as entertaining and accessible for international audiences as for Ko’s devoted fans."

Accolades

References

External links

2021 films
2020s Mandarin-language films
Taiwanese fantasy films
Taiwanese romantic comedy films
2021 fantasy films
Films directed by Giddens Ko
2021 comedy films
Films based on Taiwanese novels